Cropredy railway station was formerly a railway station on the Great Western Railway at Great Bourton, Oxfordshire, serving the village of Cropredy. The station building was of brick and wood, and there was a goods siding.

History
The Oxford and Rugby Railway had been built from  northwards past Cropredy by 1852. It never reached , but at  it met the Birmingham and Oxford Junction Railway and thus became part of an important north–south main line. The Great Western Railway took over the O&RR before it was completed, and opened Cropredy railway station to serve the village. British Railways closed the station in 1956. The station was demolished and few traces remain. The railway remains open as part of the Chiltern Main Line.

Routes

References

External links
Cropredy station on navigable 1946 O. S. map
Cropredy station circa 1908

Disused railway stations in Oxfordshire
Former Great Western Railway stations
Railway stations in Great Britain opened in 1853
Railway stations in Great Britain closed in 1956